Maksim Igorevich Devyatovskiy (born 22 April 1984) is a Russian artistic gymnast.

Career

He came 24th at the World Artistic Gymnastics Championships in 2007, and 5th in 2006.

Deviatovski won the all-around title of the Russian Championships in 2008.

At the 2008 Summer Olympics he finished 6th in the individual All-Around.

He won the 2010 American Cup.

See also
 List of Olympic male artistic gymnasts for Russia

References

External links
 
 NBC Olympics biography

Russian male artistic gymnasts
1984 births
Living people
Olympic gymnasts of Russia
Gymnasts at the 2004 Summer Olympics
Gymnasts at the 2008 Summer Olympics
Medalists at the World Artistic Gymnastics Championships
European champions in gymnastics
21st-century Russian people